Harbour Island is an island and administrative district in the Bahamas and is located off the northeast coast of Eleuthera Island. It has a population of 1,762 (2010 census).

The only town on the island is Dunmore Town, named after the governor of the Bahamas from 1786 to 1798, John Murray, 4th Earl of Dunmore, who had a summer residence on Harbour Island.

Tourism
Harbour Island is famous for its pink sand beaches, which are found all along the east side of the island. 
The pink hue comes from foraminifera, a microscopic organism that actually has a reddish-pink shell.
Harbour Island is a popular vacation destination for Americans. Known as Briland to the locals, Harbour Island is colourful with English Colonial-style buildings and flower lined streets. Harbour Island is part of the Out Islands of the Bahamas.

In the middle 1960s, the American actor Brett King and his wife, Sharon, established the Coral Sands Hotel in Harbour Island.

Transportation
The island is accessible by airplane through North Eleuthera Airport, followed by a short water taxi ride from neighbouring North Eleuthera.

Gallery

References

Sources
The Harbour Island Story, Anne & Jim Lawlor (Macmillan Caribbean, 2008) 
The Story of The Bahamas, Paul Albury (Macmillan Caribbean, London, 1975) 
Out Island Doctor, Evan Cottman
Under The plop o lop Tree, Pip Simmons, editor; 'Uncle Gundy' narrator, Barbra Young Photographs
99-Cent Breakfast, Patricia Glinton-Meicholas
Bahamian Scene, Susan J. Wallace
Wind From The Carolinas, Robert Wilder
Islanders in the Stream: A History of the Bahamian People - Volume One: From Aboriginal Times to the End of Slavery, Michael Craton and Gail Saunders (University of Georgia Press, Athens, 1999) 

Districts of the Bahamas
Islands of the Bahamas